Vida Guerra (born March 19, 1974) is a Cuban-born American glamour model and actress. Her first notable appearance was in the U.S. edition of FHM magazine in December 2002; since then, she has modeled for many other men's magazines.

Early life
Born in Havana, Cuba, Guerra, still a child, migrated with her family to the United States, moving to Perth Amboy, New Jersey. While growing up, she entered several fashion shows modeling swim wear, and has appeared in music videos.

Career
Guerra's first national exposure came when she appeared in a lingerie spread for FHM in December 2002. The magazine later reported that following its publication, almost one third of received mail was from readers demanding more photos of her. She was called back for more photo shoots and became "FHM'''s Model of the Year" in 2004. Since then, she has been featured in many magazines, including DUB, Smooth, Escape, and Open Your Eyes, often as the cover girl.

Guerra has made multiple appearances on several Spanish language television programs such as entertainment gossip show El Gordo y la Flaca (The Fat guy and The Skinny girl). She has also become a staple in music videos, appearing in "Shake Ya Tailfeather" (Nelly, P. Diddy and Murphy Lee, from the Bad Boys II soundtrack, 2003) and "The New Workout Plan" (Kanye West, 2004), in "Obsession (No Es Amor)" (Frankie J featuring Baby Bash, 2005) among others. In addition, Guerra has appeared in a commercial for Burger King's TenderCrisp Bacon Cheddar Ranch, a couple of sketches on Chappelle's Show (including "R. Kelly's '(I Wanna) Piss on You' Music Video", which spoofed the R. Kelly sex tape), and the film National Lampoon's Dorm Daze 2.

In April 2005, Guerra's camera phone was allegedly hacked. Dozens of photos, including nude pictures,  were widely disseminated on the Internet. Guerra said the nude images were of another woman, and that they had been mixed with genuine, non-nude camera-phone images of her to create the false appearance that she was the naked woman pictured.

Guerra was voted Number 26 in "FHM's Top 100 Sexiest Females" of 2005 and has twice been named the winner of the magazine's "Best Butt Award". She has produced her own swimsuit calendars (and accompanying "behind the scenes" DVDs) and a 2006 DVD titled Vida Guerra: Exposed.

The July 2006 issue of Playboy featured the first formal nude photos of Guerra. Part of her motivation for posing for the magazine, she said, was the camera phone incident; she wanted people to see what she really looked like naked.

The first song from Guerra's debut album, "You Got Me", was leaked to the Internet on November 2, 2006.

In a July 2008 interview on The Jace Hall Show, she spoke about her show Livin' the Low Life, stating that "I didn't like it [lowrider cars] at first, I mean, they were cool, but now that I did the first season I'm actually gonna get one."

She also appeared in the "FHM'' sexiest woman of the year 2017", ranked at 89th position.

Filmography

Film

Television

Personal life
Guerra is a vegetarian. Regarding vegetarianism, she has stated "I feel really healthy, and it works on so many different levels, including the condition of my skin". In 2011, she appeared nude in a campaign for PETA, in support of vegetarianism.

See also
Hip hop models

References

External links

1974 births
Living people
Actresses from New Jersey
American film actresses
American female models
Cuban emigrants to the United States
Glamour models
Hip hop models
People from Havana
People from Perth Amboy, New Jersey
21st-century American actresses
21st-century American singers
21st-century American women singers